ABC ALGOL is an extension of the programming language ALGOL 60 with arbitrary data structures and user-defined operators, intended for computer algebra (symbolic mathematics). Despite its advances, it was never used as widely as Algol proper.

References

External links
 
 
 

ALGOL 60 dialect